Baron Fredrik Wilhelm Carpelan (1778–1829), from the Carpelan family, was a Swedish baron and official.  He was secretary of state for war from 1809 to 1810, and was crucial in the developing of Sweden's postal service.

References 

1778 births
1829 deaths
Swedish Ministers for Defence
Barons of Sweden
Burials at Norra begravningsplatsen